The Boogie Boys were an American hip hop group from Harlem, New York City.

It was the first hip hop group that signed with Capitol Records, and it had a major hit in America in 1985 with the single "A Fly Girl" and two successful albums.

In 1988, Rudy Sheriff left the group and, soon after, it disbanded.

The group were veterans in sampling using high end systems such as the Synclavier, the Fairlight, an Emulator and the DKI Synergy synthesizer.

Members
William "Boogie Knight" Stroman (deceased) 
Joe "Romeo J.D." Malloy
Rudy "Lil' Rahiem" Sheriff

Discography

Albums

Charting Singles
"You Ain't Fresh (High Noon Mix)" (1985) US R&B #60
"A Fly Girl" (1985) US Hot 100 #102 US R&B #6
"Girl Talk" (1986) US R&B #62

References

Capitol Records artists
Hip hop groups from New York City